The Avon Cities Jazz Band was a jazz band from Bristol, England, from 1949 to 2000. The band performed jazz standards such as "Cotton Tail" and their own songs.

One example of their compositions is "African Song" from their album Tempo Fugit, which was released in the 1990s. The Avon Cities were successful in the 1970s and 1980s.

Members
The core members of the band:
 Geoff Nichols – trumpeter and writer of many of pieces
 Mike Hitchings – trombone, soprano saxophone, alto saxophone, and mandolin player, who also wrote somepieces
 Ray Bush – clarinet player who occasionally sang (left in 1984 when he moved to the U.S.)

Other notable members of the band included:
 Chris Pope – drummer from 1964 until 1995
 Frank Feeney – guitarist from 1961 until 1988
 Dave Collett – main pianist from 1963 onward
 Clive Morton – bassist for over 20 years
 Basil Wright – drummer before Chris Pope
 Malcolm Wright – bass player (brother of Basil)
 Jan Ridd – pianist in the late 1950s
 Wayne Chandler – banjo and guitar player in the late 1950s
 Martin Genge – saxophone player from the 1980s onward
 Frank Woodford – drummer from 1995 onward

Geoff Nichols and Mike Hitchings never left the band, playing from 1949 until 2000. In 1952,  Nichols, Hitchings, Bush, and Wright formed the Avon Cities Skiffle Group.

References
 

English jazz ensembles
Musical groups from Bristol